In September 1935, Elwood Higginbotham was lynched by a white mob in Oxford, Mississippi.

Background
Elwood Higginbotham was a 29 year old African American tenant farmer. He was indicted and jailed for allegedly shooting his landholder in self-defense. It appeared that a conviction was unlikely.

Murder
On September 17, 1935, a mob broke into his cell and abducted him. He was lynched at the intersection of North Lamar Boulevard and Molly Barr Road.

No one was ever prosecuted for his murder. His mother and family fled Mississippi after the lynching.

Legacy
After Higginbotham's lynching, NAACP Secretary Walter White wrote to President Franklin Roosevelt to call for a federal anti-lynching bill.

In 2018, a plaque was placed where he was believed to have been lynched.

References

1935 murders in the United States
1935 in Mississippi
Deaths by person in Mississippi
Lynching deaths in Mississippi
Male murder victims
Murdered African-American people
People murdered in Mississippi
Racially motivated violence against African Americans